Henry Mills (October 11, 1873 – December 20, 1959), better known as Harry Mills, was a locomotive engineer before being elected to the Legislative Assembly of Ontario as the Labour candidate for the riding of Fort William in the October 1919 election. He was appointed to the cabinet as its first Minister of Mines and served until his defeat in the general election of June 1923.

Biography
Born in Wales in 1873, and later raised in Birmingham, England, he commenced work about 1893 as a wiper in the Canadian Pacific Railway roundhouse at Fort William and rose through the ranks from fireman to locomotive engineer. He was active in the Brotherhood of Locomotive Engineers, and was elected to the Fort William Board of Education serving as its chairman during 1917–1919. Construction of the Fort William Collegiate Institute began in 1919 under his leadership.

Following his election as MLA in 1919, the Independent Labour Party nominated him to become Ontario's first Minister of Mines, a move that caused some controversy. He sat in Cabinet as Minister without Portfolio until the new Department was officially created, after which he was named its Minister.

On July 24, 1900 at Port Arthur, Ontario, he married Mabel E. McKenzie, with whom he had five children. She died in November 1925 at Brandon, Manitoba, where Mills had resumed railroading after his defeat in 1923.

Mills died at Vancouver, British Columbia in December 1959.

Cabinet positions

References

Notes

Citations

External links

1873 births
1959 deaths
Labour MPPs in Ontario
Members of the Executive Council of Ontario
Politicians from Thunder Bay
People from Caerphilly
Brotherhood of Locomotive Engineers and Trainmen people
Trade unionists from Ontario
British emigrants to Canada